Steven Clare LaTourette (July 22, 1954 – August 3, 2016) was an American politician who served as the U.S. representative for  and then  from 1995 to 2013. He was a member of the Republican Party. On July 30, 2012, it was reported that he would retire at the end of his term and not seek re-election. He subsequently co-founded a lobbying firm.

Early life, education and career
LaTourette was born in Cleveland, Ohio, the son of Patricia Munn and Eugene LaTourette, an accountant. The LaTourette family were French Huguenots who fled persecution in the 1600s and first settled in Staten Island, New York.

A graduate of Cleveland Heights High School (1972) and the University of Michigan, LaTourette studied law at the Cleveland State University College of Law.

After a stint as a public defender, LaTourette was elected the County Prosecutor of Lake County, Ohio, and served from 1989 to 1995. There, he made his name prosecuting the Kirtland mass murders that were organized by mass-murderer and self-proclaimed prophet, Jeffrey Lundgren.

U.S. House of Representatives

Committee assignments
 Committee on Appropriations
 Subcommittee on Interior, Environment, and Related Agencies
 Subcommittee on Legislative Branch
 Subcommittee on Transportation, Housing and Urban Development, and Related Agencies (vice chair)

LaTourette was a member of the Republican Main Street Partnership. In 2006, LaTourette co-authored the Financial Data Protection Act of 2006, which sought to unify state and federal laws on banking and privacy and ease the burden of patchwork legislation.

Positions
In 1997, LaTourette sponsored H.R. 1151, a law that among other things exempted credit unions chartered for the purpose of making, or had a history of primarily making, member business loans, from certain regulatory restrictions. The effect of the deregulatory change was to increase risky lending to taxi companies, helping temporarily drive up the price of tax licenses before eventually resulting in large credit union losses and hundreds of bankruptcies.

LaTourette had voted to impeach Bill Clinton for the Lewinsky scandal while he himself was having a long-term affair with his chief of staff, Jennifer Laptook.

On Thursday, March 17, 2011, LaTourette became one of only seven Republicans who voted "NO" on a measure introduced in the US House of Representatives to strip all government funding from NPR.

In a meeting with transit advocates, LaTourette disparaged fellow legislators, referring to them as "knuckledraggers that came in during the last election that hate taxes" and are reluctant even to consider raising revenues as part of a compromise to extend the debt ceiling.

On June 28, 2012, LaTourette was one of only two Republicans (along with Scott Rigell of Virginia) who voted against a motion to hold Attorney General Eric Holder in criminal contempt of Congress, though he did vote to bring civil charges against Holder for his handling of the Fast and Furious gunrunning scandal.

Political campaigns

1994
LaTourette was elected to the House in 1994 in the wave of Republican successes in that year, defeating incumbent Eric Fingerhut. LaTourette served the 19th district of Ohio from 1995 to 2003. After another district was eliminated in the round of redistricting following the 2000 Census, LaTourette's district was renumbered to the 14th district of Ohio, where he represented the eastern suburbs of Cleveland, northeastern Summit County, northern Trumbull County, northern Portage County, Ashtabula County, Lake County, and Geauga County.

2008

2010

LaTourette defeated Democratic nominee and former Appellate Court judge Bill O'Neill in the general election, along with Libertarian nominee and accountant John Jelenic.

2012
On July 30, 2012, it was reported that LaTourette would retire at the end of his term and not seek re-election.

Electoral history

Write-in and minor candidate notes:  In 2002, Sid Stone received 113 votes.

Post-congressional career
LaTourette established a Super PAC, Defending Main Street. The PAC was created to curb the influence of the Tea Party movement in the Republican Party.

Despite his previous opposition to same-sex marriage, in 2015, LaTourette signed a Supreme Court brief to support the overturn of state bans on the practice.

Illness and death
In mid-2014 LaTourette discovered that he had pancreatic cancer. Consequently, he filed a claim in May 2015 against the Office of the Attending Physician of the United States Congress citing a lack of information in that regard when he was observed earlier. LaTourette died on August 3, 2016, from pancreatic cancer, aged 62.

See also
 Ohio's 19th congressional district
 Ohio's 14th congressional district
 List of federal political sex scandals in the United States
 List of United States representatives from Ohio

References

External links

 President Steven C. LaTourette at McDonald Hopkins Government Strategies
 
 
 Profile at SourceWatch
 Retiring Rep. Steve LaTourette: You have to ‘hand over your wallet and your voting card’ to extremes, Rosalind S. Helderman, Washington Post, July 31, 2012

|-

1954 births
2016 deaths
20th-century American lawyers
20th-century American politicians
21st-century American politicians
Methodists from Ohio
American prosecutors
Cleveland Heights High School alumni
Cleveland–Marshall College of Law alumni
Deaths from cancer in Virginia
Deaths from pancreatic cancer
Ohio lawyers
Politicians from Cleveland
Republican Party members of the United States House of Representatives from Ohio
University of Michigan alumni
Public defenders
Members of Congress who became lobbyists